Hannan Younis is a Canadian actress and comedian. She is most noted for her voice performance as Safra in the 2017 animated web series PeopleWatching, for which she was a Canadian Screen Award nominee for Best Actress in a Web Series at the 6th Canadian Screen Awards in 2018.

She has also had a guest role as Ange Werewolf in What We Do in the Shadows, and a recurring role as Emily in Ruby and the Well. In 2021 she appeared in two episodes of Roast Battle Canada, competing against Stacey McGunnigle in the second episode and Keith Pedro in the seventh.

In 2022, she was announced as part of the cast of the forthcoming comedy series Bria Mack Gets a Life.

References

External links

21st-century Canadian actresses
21st-century Canadian comedians
Canadian film actresses
Canadian television actresses
Canadian stand-up comedians
Canadian women comedians
Black Canadian actresses
Black Canadian comedians
Living people
Year of birth missing (living people)